Corporate may refer to either

 A corporation,  a type of legal entity, often formed to conduct business
 Corporate (2006 film), a 2006 Bollywood film starring Bipasha Basu
 Corporate (2017 film), a 2017 French film
 Corporate (TV series), a 2018 American comedy series

See also
Corporation (disambiguation)